Aspen Grove Cemetery is a cemetery in Burlington, Iowa. In 2022, it was listed as an historic district on the National Register of Historic Places.

History
Aspen Grove Cemetery was established in 1843. The Aspen Grove Cemetery Association was approved by the Legislature of the Iowa Territory in December 1843 and they first met on January 3, 1844. Charles Starker, the first president of the Cemetery Association, designed and laid out a large portion of the cemetery.

Initially, ten acres were purchased in 1844 and an additional eight acres were purchased shortly after. In 1866, 32 more acres were purchased for the cemetery. Between 1867 and 1875, the cemetery had 2,173 interments. By 1887, the cemetery had near 9,000 interments. By 1935, the cemetery had 32,000 interments and had expanded to around 100 acres.

By 1930, the cemetery started expanding to the north, laying out roads closer to Sunnyside Avenue.

Notable interments
 G. F. A. Atherton (1790–1882), member of the Wisconsin State Assembly and Wisconsin Legislature
 Tony Baker (1945–1998), NFL player of the New Orleans Saints, Philadelphia Eagles, Los Angeles Rams, and San Diego Chargers
 Floy Little Bartlett (1883–1956), composer
 Nicholas Bouquet (1842–1912), Medal of Honor recipient and soldier in the Civil War
 James Clarke (1812–1850), 3rd governor of Iowa Territory
 John M. Corse (1835–1893), general in the Union Army, lieutenant governor of Iowa
 Augustus C. Dodge (1812–1883), U.S. Representative from Iowa Territory, U.S. minister to Spain, U.S. senator from Iowa
 Henry Dodge (1782–1867), U.S. Representative, Senator, and Governor of the Wisconsin Territory
 John H. Gear (1825–1900), 11th governor of Iowa
 James Isham Gilbert (1823–1884), general in the Union Army
 James W. Grimes (1816–1872), 3rd governor of Iowa and U.S. senator
 Benton Jay Hall (1835–1894), U.S. Representative From Iowa
 Thomas Hedge (1844–1920), U.S. Representative from Iowa
 John Flournoy Henry (1793–1873), U.S. Representative from Kentucky
 Jacob Gartner Lauman (1813–1867), businessman and general in the Union Army
 Isaac Leffler (1788–1866), American lawyer and U.S. Representative from Virginia
 Shepherd Leffler (1811–1879), U.S. Representative from Iowa
 Aldo Leopold (1887–1948), author, conservationalist, and educator
 Charles L. Matthies (1824–1868), Union Army officer
 William Butler Remey (1842–1895), colonel in the Union Army
 Jeremiah Smith Jr. (1802–1862), representative of the Wisconsin Territorial Assembly
 Joseph Champlin Stone (1829–1902), U.S. Representative from Iowa

References

1843 establishments in Iowa Territory
Burlington, Iowa
National Register of Historic Places in Des Moines County, Iowa
Cemeteries on the National Register of Historic Places in Iowa
Historic districts in Des Moines County, Iowa
Historic districts on the National Register of Historic Places in Iowa